EBX may refer to:
 East Bay Express, a California newspaper
 EB Games Expo, an Australian video game convention
 EBX (album), a four-volume box set by the band Erasure
 EBX Group, a Brazil-based company group with oil-based business
 Embedded Board eXpandable, a computer motherboard form factor
 EBX, a videogame retailer owned by Electronics Boutique
 EBX register, a processor register on the IA-32 microprocessor architecture
 Electronic Brachytherapy (EBX) - treatment for skin cancer